Aristidis "Kamaras" Katrodaylis (born 2 March 1939) is a retired Greek footballer and lawyer.

He started his career at Apollon Athens as a defender. His career at Apollon didn't last long as Panathinaikos picked him up at a young age in the Summer of 1961.

Kamaras played as a right back and a defensive midfielder for PAO for 12 years. He won 6 league titles with the "Greens" and was one of the key men that took PAO to the 1971 European Cup Final v. Ajax Amsterdam. He was the scorer of the 3rd vital goal which was to take PAO past Red Star Belgrade into the final. He also scored PAO'S lone goal in Belgrade that gave the team hope for the return leg after losing 4–1.

Kamaras also played for the National Football Team for 14 years (30 caps). He made his debut vs Denmark in 1960 in a friendly game Greece lost 7–2 in Copenhagen.

After retirement, he entered the legal profession full-time. He came back to football as President of Apollon Athens.

References

External links
 profile

1939 births
Living people
Apollon Smyrnis F.C. players
Panathinaikos F.C. players
Super League Greece players
Greece international footballers
Panathinaikos F.C. non-playing staff
Association football defenders
Footballers from Athens
Greek footballers